Hemsby railway station was a station in Hemsby, Norfolk. It was on the line between Melton Constable and Great Yarmouth. It was closed in 1959.

References

Disused railway stations in Norfolk
Former Midland and Great Northern Joint Railway stations
Railway stations in Great Britain opened in 1878
Railway stations in Great Britain closed in 1959